Time to Suck is the first and only album by the South African hard rock band Suck. Released in 1971, it was recorded at the EMI Studios in Johannesburg in six hours.

Other than the song "The Whip", a Suck original, all songs are covers of bands like King Crimson and Deep Purple.

An outtake from the session, a cover of "War Pigs" by Black Sabbath, was released on the compilation Rock Today with the Big Heavies! in 1972, alongside "Aimless Lady", "21st Century Schizoid Man" and "The Whip".

Track list 

"Aimless Lady" was released as a single in 1971, with "The Whip" on the B side. On the original, Megaphone and Shadoks vinyl editions of Time to Suck, "Sin's a Good Man's Brother" begins side B. "I'll Be Creeping" begins Side B of the Manik release.

Versions 
The album was initially only released in South Africa. In the 1980s, French label Megaphone Records released a bootleg LP version of Time to Suck, featuring inverted colours on the cover art. The first official CD release came in 2001 on Fresh Music with the bonus track "War Pigs". In 2002, a German bootleg label called Progressive Line released its own CD version of Time to Suck. German label Shadoks reissued it in 2009 on CD and vinyl, the first vinyl issue of the album since 1970. The vinyl editions came with a 33 1/3 rpm 7" containing the track "War Pigs". In 2019, Time to Suck was reissued on LP by Greek label Manik Records, incorporating "War Pigs" into the tracklisting.

Personnel 
 Andrew Ionnides – vocals, flute
 Stephen Gilroy – guitar
 Louis Forer – bass
 Saverio Grande – drums

References

External links 
 Time to Suck at Discogs (list of versions)

1971 albums
Suck (band) albums